Bad Vibes is the debut studio album by American electronic musician Shlohmo. It was released through Friends of Friends on August 9, 2011.

Critical reception

At Metacritic, which assigns a weighted average score out of 100 to reviews from mainstream critics, the album received an average score of 82, based on 7 reviews, indicating "universal acclaim".

David Dacks of Exclaim! gave the album a favorable review, describing Shlohmo as "a master sound artist with funky, song-oriented underpinnings making it all sound relevant." Ari Lipsitz of CMJ commented that the album is "more melodic and less frenzied" in comparison with Flying Lotus' work.

LA Weekly placed the album at number 6 on the "Top 10 Los Angeles Albums of 2011" list.

Track listing

References

External links
 

2011 debut albums
Shlohmo albums